Arkino is a rural locality (a selo) and the administrative center of Arkinskoye Rural Settlement, Komarichsky District, Bryansk Oblast, Russia. The population was 473 as of 2010. There are 6 streets.

Geography 
Arkino is located 13 km northwest of Komarichi (the district's administrative centre) by road. Ivanovsky is the nearest rural locality.

References 

Rural localities in Komarichsky District
Sevsky Uyezd